The second series of the British television sitcom Absolutely Fabulous premiered on BBC One on 27 January 1994 and concluded on 10 March 1994, consisting of six episodes.

Cast and characters

Main
 Jennifer Saunders as Edina Monsoon
 Joanna Lumley as Patsy Stone 
 Julia Sawalha as Saffron Monsoon 
 Jane Horrocks as Bubble

Special guest
 June Whitfield as Mother

Guest

 Kathy Burke as Magda
 Helen Lederer as Catriona
 Harriet Thorpe as Fleur
 Jennifer Piercey as Antonia
 Naoko Mori as Sarah
 Llewella Gideon as nurse
 Orla Brady as Nurse Mary
 David Henry as Mr Simpson
 Gwen Humble as Sondra Lorrance
 Christopher Ryan as Marshall
 Mark Tandy as Mark
 Natascha McElhone (as Natascha Taylor) as art gallery assistant
 Ciaran McIntyre as vicar
 Haroon Hanif as Yentob
 Karim Skalli as Ali
 Mark Wing-Davey as Malcolm
 Christopher Malcolm as Justin
 Miranda Forbes as woman in car
 Hugh Ross as judge
 Helena McCarthy as old woman
 Wolf Christian as fireman
 Jane Galloway as 1950s nurse
 Mari Mackenzie as dancer
 Mia Soteriou as guitar player
 Suzy Aitchison as 1970s nurse

Special guest stars

 Mandy Rice-Davies as 'Patsy'
 Helena Bonham Carter as 'Saffy'
 Richard E. Grant as 'Justin'
 Suzi Quatro as 'Nurse'
 Germaine Greer as 'Mother'
 Sylvia Anderson as voice of Lady Penelope
 John Wells as Uncle Humphrey
 Britt Ekland as herself
 Lulu as herself
 Zandra Rhodes as herself
 Jo Brand as Carmen
 Meera Syal as Suzy
 Adrian Edmondson as Hamish
 Miranda Richardson as Bettina
 Patrick Barlow as Max
 Eleanor Bron as Patsy's mother
 Philip Franks as poet

Episodes

Accolades

Home media

VHS
 "Series 2" – volume 1 ("Hospital"/"Death"/"Morocco") – 19 October 1994
 "Series 2" – volume 2 ("New Best Friend"/"Poor"/"Birth") – 19 October 1994
 "The Complete Series 2" – 3 June 1996
 As part of the "Series 1–3" VHS set (6-VHS set)
 As part of the "Series 1–4" VHS set – 25 November 2002 (8-VHS set)
 "The Complete Series 2" re-release – 25 November 2002

DVD
United Kingdom
 "The Complete Series 2" – 1 October 2001
 As part of the "Series 1–4" DVD set – 25 November 2002 (5-disc set)
 As part of the "Absolutely Everything" DVD set – 15 November 2010 (10-disc set includes series 1–5 and specials)
 As part of "Absolutely Everything: Definitive Edition" – 17 March 2014 (11-disc set includes series 1–5, specials and 20th Anniversary specials)

United States
 "The Complete Series 2" – 13 March 2001
 "The Complete Series 2" (re-release) – 13 September 2005
 As part of the "Series 1–3" DVD set – 13 March 2001 (4-disc set)
 As part of the "Series 1–3" DVD set re-release – 4 October 2005 (4-disc set)
 As part of the "Absolutely Everything" DVD set – 27 May 2008 (9-disc set includes series 1–5 & specials)
 As part of the "Absolutely All of It!" DVD set – 5 November 2013 (10-disc set includes series 1–5, specials and 20th Anniversary specials)

Australia
 "The Complete Series 2" – 28 February 2002
 As part of the "Absolutely Everything" DVD set – 20 April 2006 (9-disc set includes series 1–5 and specials; excluding "The Last Shout")
 As part of the "Complete Collection" DVD set – 5 April 2011 (10-disc set includes series 1–5 and specials)
 As part of "Absolutely Everything: Definitive Edition" – 30 April 2014 (11-disc set includes series 1–5, specials and 20th Anniversary specials)

Notes

References

External links
 Absolutely Fabulous series 2 – list of episodes on IMDb

1994 British television seasons
Series 2